The 2021–22 Northern Counties East Football League season was the 40th in the history of Northern Counties East Football League, a football competition in England.

The allocations for the league this season were announced by The Football Association (The FA) on 18 May 2021.

After the abandonment of the 2019–20 and 2020–21 seasons due to the COVID-19 pandemic in England, numerous promotions were decided on a points per game basis over the previous two seasons.

Premier Division

The Premier Division featured 17 clubs which competed in the previous season, along with three new clubs:
Emley, promoted from Division One
Sherwood Colliery, promoted from the East Midlands Counties League
Winterton Rangers, promoted from Division One

League table

Inter-step play-offs

Stadia and locations

Division One

Division One featured 16 clubs which competed in the previous season, along with five new clubs, transferred from the East Midlands Counties League:
 Clipstone
 Ollerton Town
 Rainworth Miners Welfare
 Shirebrook Town
 Teversal

Also, East Hull were renamed as FC Humber United.

League table

Play-offs

Stadia and locations

League Cup

The 2021–22 Northern Counties East Football League League Cup was the 40th season of the league cup competition of the Northern Counties East Football League.

References

External links
 Northern Counties East Football League

2021–22
9